Rafanata is an egg-based dish from the Italian region of Basilicata. The name comes from rafano, the main ingredient of the dish, which means "horseradish" in Italian. It is a kind of baked frittata made with horseradish, potato and cheese; another type of rafanata includes sausage. Rafanata is typical of the carnival and winter periods.

It is featured in Jamie Oliver's book Jamie cooks Italy. With ministerial decree of 25 February 2022, rafanata entered the list of traditional Lucanian agri-food products (PAT).

History 
Dish of peasant origin, it takes its name from horseradish, the rhizome of the plant Armoracia rusticana, a root with a strongly balsamic and spicy taste, probably introduced by the Normans in Basilicata around the 11th century. Horseradish is an essential ingredient of traditional Lucanian cuisine; it often appeared on the tables of farmers and shepherds, being inexpensive, rich in health properties and a good source of vitamins. Therefore, horseradish is also known in Basilicata as "u tartuf’ d’i povr òmm ", meaning "poor man's truffle".

Rafanata is traditionally a dish linked to the Carnival festivities, prepared from the feast of Saint Anthony (January 17), until Shrove Tuesday. The traditional recipe, of which there are variations depending on the area of Basilicata, provides as basic ingredients a beaten of many eggs, seasoned with grated pecorino, fresh horseradish, potato and lard.

See also
 Cuisine of Basilicata
 List of egg dishes

References

External links
Recipe

Egg dishes
Omelettes
Cuisine of Basilicata